Indranil Sanjaybhai Rajguru is an Indian politician and former member of the Gujarat Legislative Assembly. He was elected from Rajkot constituency in 2012.

He is a member of Indian National Congress (INC).

In April 2022, he left INC and joined Aam Aadmi Party (AAP) but returned to INC in November 2022.

References

Gujarat MLAs 2012–2017
Year of birth missing (living people)
Living people
Former members of Aam Aadmi Party
Indian National Congress politicians from Gujarat